Patrick Lowry (19 December 1936 – 18 September 2014) was an Irish sprinter. He competed in the men's 100 metres at the 1960 Summer Olympics. He was educated at Synge Street CBS.

References

1936 births
2014 deaths
Athletes (track and field) at the 1960 Summer Olympics
Irish male sprinters
Olympic athletes of Ireland
Place of birth missing
People educated at Synge Street CBS